Adam Doneger (born December 5, 1980, in Hewlett, New York) is a former professional  lacrosse player.  He attended and played his college lacrosse at Johns Hopkins University where he was team Captain as a senior and a two-time First Team All-American.

International career
Doneger played for the 2002 U.S. Men's National Team in World Lacrosse Championship that won the Gold Medal.

Professional career
Doneger was a midfielder with the New Jersey Pride in Major League Lacrosse. He won the Major League Lacrosse Rookie of the Year Award in 2003.  He retired prior to the 2008 season.  Since 2003, Doneger has been in the real estate business in NYC where he currently works at Cushman & Wakefield on their Capital Markets team.

Statistics

MLL

NCAA (Division I)

Awards

See also
Johns Hopkins Blue Jays lacrosse

References

1980 births
American lacrosse players
Johns Hopkins Blue Jays men's lacrosse players
Living people
Major League Lacrosse major award winners
Major League Lacrosse players
People from Hewlett, New York
Sportspeople from New York (state)
New Jersey Pride players
Rochester Rattlers players